Fredrick Pierce Vaughan (October 8, 1904 – October 16, 1986) was an All-Southern college football guard for the North Carolina State Wolfpack of North Carolina State University. One account reads "Vaughan is noted for his consistent playing week after week. He always is depended on and never fails to play his usual steady game. He is the main gun in the State line."

Early years
Fred Vaughan was born on October 8, 1904 in Roanoke Rapids, North Carolina to Cornelius R. Vaughan and Carry Bell Gray.

References

NC State Wolfpack football players
American football guards
All-Southern college football players
1904 births
1986 deaths
Players of American football from North Carolina
People from Roanoke Rapids, North Carolina